Karen Wheeler (born in Cheyenne, Wyoming) is Wyoming politician who served as Acting Secretary of State of Wyoming between February 9, 2018 and March 1, 2018. She is a member of Republican Party.

She was born in Cheyenne and graduated from University of Wyoming. She has worked in the Secretary of State's Office for 31 years, including 7 years as Director of the Compliance Division. She became Deputy Director in 2015, responsible for planning, budget, personnel, staff development and oversight of service to the public. After the resignation of secretary Ed Murray amid scandal, she became his successor in 2018.

She is married and has children.

References 

20th-century births
21st-century American politicians
Women in Wyoming politics
Politicians from Cheyenne, Wyoming
Secretaries of State of Wyoming
University of Wyoming alumni
Wyoming Republicans
Living people
Year of birth missing (living people)
21st-century American women politicians